The 2004 Canadian National Challenge Cup took place in Charlottetown, Prince Edward Island from the sixth to the eleventh of October.  The seedings were based on the previous year's performance by province.

Teams
 Alberta - Calgary Callies
 Quebec - SC Panellinios Montréal
 British Columbia - Pegasus FC
 Manitoba - Lucania
 Prince Edward Island - Velvet Underground
 Nova Scotia - Halifax Celtic Soccer Pro
 New Brunswick - Fundy Labatt United
 Saskatchewan - Saskatoon Arsenal
 Ontario - Ottawa Royals
 Newfoundland & Labrador - Marystown United

Results

Rosters

Surrey Pegasus FC
Surrey (Squad): Rob Iorio, Trevor Short, Randy Celebrini, Gavin Frey, Eddie Cannon, Paul Dailly, Darin
Burr, Adam Costley, Ryan Powell, Nico Berg, Mike Dodd, Ryan Green, Robin Regnier, Frank Lore, Jamie
Fiddler, Stedman Espinoza, Laurent Scalignine, Rob Reed, Steve London, Shawn Perry.

Ottawa Royals 
Ottawa (Squad): Erik Lefebre - Andriy Sowarek, Simon Bonk, Declen Bonper, Dan Cheney, Sylvain Cloutier,
Drew Dailey, Dan Degenutti, Alec Edgar, Dave Foley, Kweis Loney, Dylan Loy, Ewan Lyttle, Gord
MacDonald, James MacMillan, Victor Mendes, Sanjeev Permar, Marcelo Plada, Dom Rochon, Roland Tinmuh.

References

Notes from Gord Dunphy
CSA Media Release

2004
Canadian National Challenge Cup
Nat
Sport in Charlottetown